Club My-O-My was a former nightclub in the New Orleans area that employed female impersonators as entertainers. Its predecessers were the Wonder Bar, and the Wonder Club.

History

Wonder Bar 
In 1933, a predecessor to Club My-O-My, the Wonder Bar, opened up with underground drag shows. The Wonder Bar was located in the French Quarter at 125 Decatur Street.

In 1936, the Wonder Bar was raided by police. Owner Emile Morlet requested an injunction in court, but was denied on grounds that the club was a menace to morality.

Wonder Club 
In 1936, after the police raid of the Wonder Bar, it was moved to Jefferson Parish, outside police jurisdiction, and reopened as the Wonder Club.

Club My-O-My 
In the late 1940's, the Wonder Club was renamed to Club My-O-My. The name Club My-O-My was in use as early as October 1947, when it appeared in Billboard magazine.

On May 4, 1948, Club My-O-My was badly damaged by a fire, but was rebuilt shortly thereafter.

Club My-O-My had a sheriff assigned to keep watch at the front door for any issues. If there were issues, entertainers would deny any accusations.

On January 17, 1972, Club My-O-My was destroyed by a second fire.

Demographics 
One source says that Club My-O-My catered to a white audience, both heterosexuals and homosexuals, and was popular with tourists.

Another source characterizes club-goers as mainly middle-class white heterosexuals and tourists.

Culture 
Kate Marlowe (born Kenneth Marlowe) worked as a female impersonator at Club My-O-My in the 1960's, and describes the close bond of the entertainers there:

Sex work 
Marlowe describes Club My-O-My's culture of entertainers mixing with guests and hustling tables:

Customers purchased overpriced drinks, photos of female impersonators in drag, or other small items. In some cases they paid to see or touch entertainers. If customers paid enough, they could arrange for a "date" with an entertainer. These "dates" occurred primarily in the apartments of the female impersonators, who lived near one another in the French Quarter. Away from work, entertainers from Club My-O-My also cruised the French Quarter for tourists, to turn tricks.

See also 
 Club 82 – New York City nightclub featuring female impersonators.
 Finocchio's Club – San Francisco nightclub featuring female impersonators.

References

External links 
 New Orleans Historical: Club My-O-My: New Orleans Vintage Drag
 Queer Music Heritage: Club My-O-My: New Orleans

Culture of New Orleans
Defunct nightclubs
History of New Orleans